

Group A

Head coach:  Júlio César Leal

Head coach:  Jørgen Erik Larsen

Head coach:  Aleksandr Kuznetsov (ru)

Head coach:  Anatoly Baidachny

Group B

Head coach:  Baudouin Ribakare

Head coach:  Leonardo Véliz

Head coach:  Koji Tanaka

Head coach:  Andoni Goikoetxea

Group C

Head coach:  José Pekerman

Head coach:  Luis Paz Camargo

Head coach:   Rinus Israël

Head coach:   Nelo Vingada

Group D

Head coach:  Les Scheinflug

Head coach:  Jean Manga-Onguene

Head coach:  Luis Roberto Sibaja

Head coach:  Hans-Jürgen Dörner

References

External links
FIFA.com

FIFA U-20 World Cup squads
Fifa World Youth Championship Squads, 1995